Dithiofluorescein (sometimes generically called thiofluorescein) is a complexometric indicator used in analytical chemistry. It changes from blue to colorless when it binds to mercury(2+) ions. It thus can indicate the endpoint in the titration of thiols using o-hydroxymercuribenzoic acid or its sodium salt. The reagent can be immobilized t in a polymer on a fiber optic, which might allow development of a detector for sulfide ions in a flow cell. Unlike fluorescein and other related fluoran dyes that have oxygen substituents on the benzene rings, dithiofluorescein, which has sulfur substituents, is not fluorescent.

References 

Analytical reagents
Complexometric indicators
Triarylmethane dyes
Spiro compounds
Lactones
Thiols